Events from the year 2001 in Romania.

Incumbents 

President: Ion Iliescu 
Prime Minister: Adrian Năstase

Events 

 29 May – The president of the Constitutional Court, Lucian Mihai, announces his resignation.
 7 June – The resignation of Lucian Mihai from the Constitutional Court goes into effect. 

 6 August – An explosion occurs at the Vulcan mine.
 10 October – President Iliescu promulgates Law on Free Access to Information of Public Interest.

 30 October – A Romanian government commission reveals corruption in the international adoption business.
 29 November – The Senate approves the stripping of political immunity of Corneliu Vadim Tudor for spreading misinformation. The voting session had 88 votes in favour and 2 against.

Full date unknown 
Oscar Downstream, an oil & gas trading company is founded.

Births

January
 15 January - Alexandra Agiurgiuculese, Romanian-Italian rhythmic gymnast

Deaths

January

 1 January - Constantin Rădulescu, 76, Romanian doctor, footballer and manager.

February

 17 February - Richard Wurmbrand, 91, Evangelical Lutheran priest, and professor.

March

 20 March - Ilie Verdeț, 51st prime minister of Romania (b. 1925)

July

 15 July - Marina Știrbei, 89, Romanian aviator.

August

 1 August - Nicolae Tătaru, 69, Romanian football player.

November

 14 November - Zigu Ornea, 71, Romanian literary critic, biographer and book publisher, failed surgery.

December

 21 December - Ovidiu Iacov, 20, Romanian footballer, car accident.

See also
 
2001 in Europe

References

External links 

 

2000s in Romania
 
Romania
Romania
Years of the 21st century in Romania